His Brother's Ghost is a 1945 American Western film directed by Sam Newfield.

Plot
When a group of gunmen are running sharecroppers off their land, rancher Andy Jones sends for his friend Billy Carson to organise the sharecroppers to fight. Andy is soon mortally wounded by the gunmen, but before his death schemes for his no good twin brother Fuzzy to be sent for to impersonate him.  The gunmen, witnessing Andy's funeral fear that Fuzzy is Andy's avenging ghost.

Cast
Buster Crabbe as Billy Carson
Falcon as Billy's Horse
Al St. John as Jonathan "Fuzzy" Q. Jones / Andy Jones
Charles King as Thorne
Karl Hackett as 'Doc' Packard
Arch Hall Sr. as Deputy Bentley
Roy Brent as Henchman Yeager
Bud Osborne as Henchman Magill
John L. Cason as Henchman Jarrett
Frank McCarroll as Henchman Madison
George Morrell as Foster

See also
The "Billy the Kid" films starring Buster Crabbe: 
 Billy the Kid Wanted (1941)
 Billy the Kid's Round-Up (1941)
 Billy the Kid Trapped (1942)
 Billy the Kid's Smoking Guns (1942)
 Law and Order (1942) 
 Sheriff of Sage Valley (1942) 
 The Mysterious Rider (1942)
 The Kid Rides Again (1943)
 Fugitive of the Plains (1943)
 Western Cyclone (1943)
 Cattle Stampede (1943)
 The Renegade (1943)
 Blazing Frontier (1943)
 Devil Riders (1943)
 Frontier Outlaws (1944)
 Valley of Vengeance (1944)
 The Drifter (1944) 
 Fuzzy Settles Down (1944)
 Rustlers' Hideout (1944)
 Wild Horse Phantom (1944)
 Oath of Vengeance (1944)
 His Brother's Ghost (1945) 
 Thundering Gunslingers (1945)
 Shadows of Death (1945)
 Gangster's Den (1945)
 Stagecoach Outlaws (1945)
 Border Badmen (1945)
 Fighting Bill Carson (1945)
 Prairie Rustlers (1945) 
 Lightning Raiders (1945)
 Terrors on Horseback (1946)
 Gentlemen with Guns (1946)
 Ghost of Hidden Valley (1946)
 Prairie Badmen (1946)
 Overland Riders (1946)
 Outlaws of the Plains (1946)

External links

1945 films
1940s English-language films
American black-and-white films
1945 Western (genre) films
Billy the Kid (film series)
Films directed by Sam Newfield
Producers Releasing Corporation films
American Western (genre) films
1940s American films